The 1982–83 Romanian Hockey League season was the 53rd season of the Romanian Hockey League. Four teams participated in the league, and Steaua Bucuresti won the championship.

Regular season

External links
hochei.net

Romania
Romanian Hockey League seasons
Rom